Camila Andrade Mora (born c. 1991) is a Chilean model, TV host and beauty pageant titleholder who won Miss World Chile 2013.

Miss World 2013
She was chosen on July 18, 2013, under the organization of Miss Chile.  Andrade represented Chile in Miss World 2013, in Indonesia, on September, 2013. She unplaced, but represented Rapa Nui's folk dance at "Dances of the World" segment. On the preliminaries she also placed Top 33 in the Beach Fashion challenge.
Currently she works on Chilean TV channel La Red

Filmography

References

External links
Official Miss Chile   https://twitter.com/search?q=cmiandrade&src=typd&f=realtime

Living people
Miss World Chile winners
Miss World 2013 delegates
Chilean female models
1990s births